Gaston Delaplane (6 March 1882 – 12 December 1977) was a French rower and cyclist. He won three medals in rowing at the 1906 Intercalated Games and competed in three cycling events at the 1908 Summer Olympics.

References

External links
 

1882 births
1977 deaths
French male cyclists
French male rowers
Olympic cyclists of France
Olympic rowers of France
Cyclists at the 1906 Intercalated Games
Rowers at the 1906 Intercalated Games
Cyclists at the 1908 Summer Olympics
Sportspeople from Le Havre
Medalists at the 1906 Intercalated Games
European Rowing Championships medalists
Cyclists from Normandy